Faaberg Fotball is a football club from Fåberg north of Lillehammer, Norway.

It was the club Where Norwegian international Jon Inge Høiland started his career.

Football clubs in Norway
Sport in Lillehammer